I Think I See Myself On CCTV is the fifth studio album by the Serbian alternative rock band Disciplina Kičme, but the first to be released by the London version of the band working under an alternative band name Disciplin A Kitschme. The album was released by the Tom Tom Music for former Yugoslavia and Babaroga records for the United Kingdom, the latter label was founded by the band themselves, and all the UK albums were released through the label. Most of the material on the album featured rerecorded versions of Disciplina Kičme songs, featuring lyrics in English language.

Track listing 
All tracks written by Black Tooth and arranged by Disciplin A Kitschme.

Personnel

The band 
 Black Tooth (Dušan Kojić) — bass, vocals [shouting], producer, mixed by, written by, artwork by [design] (as Koya)
 Gofie Bebe — vocals, percussion
 Beat (Pete Warren) — drums

Additional personnel 
 Winnetou — castanets
 DJ Illusion Excluder — mixed by (tracks: 1, 5, 8, 9)
 Johan Tamashi — photography
 Andreya — photography
 Leo — photography
 Emina — photography
 Dan (Dan Swift) — recorded by
 Shaun (Shaun Harvey) — recorded by, mixed by

References 
 EX YU ROCK enciklopedija 1960-2006, Janjatović Petar; 
 I Think I See Myself On CCTV at Discogs

1996 albums
Disciplina Kičme albums